Nicomedes da Conceiçăo (born 2 July 1899, date of death unknown), known as Torteroli, was a Brazilian footballer. He played in one match for the Brazil national football team in 1923. He was also part of Brazil's squad for the 1923 South American Championship.

References

1899 births
Year of death missing
Brazilian footballers
Brazil international footballers
Place of birth missing
Association footballers not categorized by position